Harry Cross may refer to:
Harry Cross (sportswriter) (1881–1946), American journalist
Harry P. Cross (1874–1955), American football player and coach
Harry Cross (Brookside), a character from the British soap opera Brookside
Ben Cross (1947–2020), English actor (real name Harry Cross)

See also
Henry Cross (disambiguation)